The Men's 50 metre freestyle competition of the 2022 FINA World Swimming Championships (25 m) was held on 16 and 17 December 2022.

Records
Prior to the competition, the existing world and championship records were as follows.

Results

Heats
The heats were started on 16 December at 12:14.

Semifinals
The semifinals were started on 16 December at 20:41.

Final
The final was held on 17 December at 21:39.

References

Men's 50 metre freestyle